Lambdapapillomavirus is a genus of viruses, in the family Papillomaviridae. Cats and dogs serve as natural hosts. There are five species in this genus. Diseases associated with this genus include: mucosal and cutaneous lesions.

Taxonomy
The following five species are assigned to the genus:
 Lambdapapillomavirus 1
 Lambdapapillomavirus 2
 Lambdapapillomavirus 3
 Lambdapapillomavirus 4
 Lambdapapillomavirus 5

Structure
Viruses in Lambdapapillomavirus are non-enveloped, with icosahedral geometries, and T=7 symmetry. The diameter is around 52-55 nm. Genomes are circular, around 8kb in length.

Life cycle
Viral replication is nuclear. Entry into the host cell is achieved by attachment of the viral proteins to host receptors, which mediates endocytosis. Replication follows the dsDNA bidirectional replication model. DNA-templated transcription, with some alternative splicing mechanism is the method of transcription. The virus exits the host cell by nuclear envelope breakdown.
Cats and dogs serve as the natural host. Transmission routes are contact.

References

External links
 ICTV Report Papillomaviridae
 Viralzone: Lambdapapillomavirus

Papillomavirus
Virus genera